The 2016 Abkhazian Cup was the 23rd edition of Abkhazian Cup organized by Football Federation of Abkhazia. The competition was held in the month of May.

Participating teams
This edition of the competition was attended by 10 teams:

FC Afon,
Samurzakan Gal,
FC Gagra,
FC Dinamo Sukhum,
Nart Sukhum
Football Club Yertsakhu Ochamchira
Football Club Spartak Gulripsh
Football Club Shakhtyor Tkuarchal
Football Club Abazg Sukhum
Ritsa FC.

The Abkhazia Cup champion team qualifies for the Abkhazia Super Cup final and face the Abkhazian Premier League champion team.

The final of the Abkhazia Cup took place on October 12, 2016.
The two teams qualified for the grand final match were Nart Sukhum and FC Gagra. Nart Sukhum won by the score of 2x1.

Games by stage

Preliminary round

First Legs

[Aug 4]
FC Gagra      2-1 Ritsa FC
      
[Aug 5]
Nart Sukhum      3-1 Shakhtyor  

Second Legs

[Aug 10]
Ritsa      2-1 FC Gagra      [Gagra on pen]

[Aug 11]
Shakhtyor  0-4 Nart Sukhum

Quarterfinals

First Legs

[Aug 16]
FC Gagra      4-1 FC Dinamo Sukhum
    
[Aug 17]
Football Club Yertsakhu Ochamchira 11-1 Football Club Abazg Sukhum
      
[Aug 18]
Samurzakan Gal 1-5 Nart Sukhum
       
[Aug 19]
FC Afon       4-0 Spartak    

Second Legs

[Sep 26]
Spartak    4-2 FC Afon
       
[Sep 27]
Football Club Abazg Sukhum      0-3 Football Club Yertsakhu Ochamchira
 
[Sep 28]
FC Dinamo Sukhum     1-0 FC Gagra
      
[Sep 29]
Nart Sukhum      w/o Samurzakan Gal

Semifinals

First Legs

[Oct 3]
FC Gagra      2-1 Football Club Yertsakhu Ochamchira
  
[Oct 5]
FC Afon       1-2 Nart Sukhum       

Second Legs

[Oct 7]
Football Club Yertsakhu Ochamchira  1-2 FC Gagra
    
[Oct 8]
Nart Sukhum       0-1 FC Afon

Final

[Oct 12, Gorodskoy stadion "Dinamo", Sukhum]

Nart Sukhum       2-1 FC Gagra

[Feras Ismail 22, Nikita Filatov 63; N.N. 76]

References

Football in Abkhazia